Crystal Visions... The Very Best of Stevie Nicks is a compilation album released by the American singer-songwriter and Fleetwood Mac vocalist Stevie Nicks. It features songs from her solo career, as well as her career with Fleetwood Mac. It includes her hit singles, a dance remix, and one new track, a live version of Led Zeppelin's "Rock and Roll". Three singles were culled from the album: "Rock and Roll", "Landslide", and a remixed version of "Stand Back". There are two versions of this album, one with just the audio CD and another version with an included DVD featuring all of Nicks' music videos with audio commentary from Nicks, as well as rare footage from the Bella Donna recording sessions. The album debuted and peaked at No. 21 in the United States selling 33,944 copies in its first week. The album spent a total of 12 weeks on the Billboard 200 chart, and had sold 348,000 copies as of February 2011. The album is certified gold in Australia and the United Kingdom.

The title refers to a lyric from "Dreams".

Track listing

Charts

Certifications

References

2007 greatest hits albums
Stevie Nicks albums
Albums produced by Jimmy Iovine
Albums produced by Waddy Wachtel
Albums produced by John Shanks
2007 video albums
Music video compilation albums
Reprise Records compilation albums